John Shapleigh (fl. 1414–1427) of Exeter, Devon, was an English politician.

Family
He was the son of the MP, John Shapleigh.

Career
He was a Member (MP) of the Parliament of England for Exeter in 
April 1414, 1417, 1419, 1420, December 1421, 1423, 1426 and 1427.

References

14th-century births
15th-century deaths
English MPs April 1414
English MPs 1417
English MPs 1419
English MPs 1420
English MPs December 1421
English MPs 1423
English MPs 1426
English MPs 1427
Members of the Parliament of England (pre-1707) for Exeter